The Oregon Trail is a strategy video game developed by Gameloft New York and Gameloft Shanghai and published by Gameloft. It was released for Java ME-based mobile phones in 2009; a high-definition version was later released for iOS the same year. The game was then ported to DSiware, followed by a number of other mobile operating systems and devices. The game was followed by two sequels: The Oregon Trail: Gold Rush and The Oregon Trail: American Settler.

Gameplay

Plot

Changes from the original version

The game expands on the 1985 game of the same name by adding more paths the player can take and minigames that can be played beyond the original version's hunting game.

Reception

Nintendo Life wrote: "As it turns out, The Oregon Trail is fun enough to stand on its own outside of class even after all these years. And with improved load times and added camera functionality, the DSiWare version is the one to beat". The site gave it an 8 out of 10.

IGN gave it an 8.5 "Great" score, writing "The Oregon Trail may be too easy for its own good at first, but this is still a great play for any gamer. Older gamers that remember the original will get a kick out of the refresh while newcomers will enjoy a game that is always offering something new to do or look at. And everybody will love the game's awesome hand-drawn visuals that truly pop off the screen. This game is gorgeous".

References

External links
 
 

2009 video games
DSiWare games
Gameloft games
BlackBerry games
IOS games
Nintendo DS games
Windows Phone games
The Oregon Trail (series)
Video games developed in China
Video games developed in the United States
Video games set in the 19th century
J2ME games